Ardijan Đokaj (Albanian: Ardian Gjokaj; born 23 May 1979) is a former professional footballer who played as a winger.

Club career
During his journeyman career, Đokaj played in Serbia and Montenegro, Spain, Turkey, and in the German second bundesliga for TuS Koblenz and 1860 Munich.

References

Honours
Mogren
 Montenegrin First League: 2010–11

Notes

External links
 
 
 
 
 
 

1979 births
Living people
People from Tuzi
Albanians in Montenegro
Association football wingers
Serbia and Montenegro footballers
Serbia and Montenegro under-21 international footballers
Montenegrin footballers
FK Budućnost Podgorica players
OFK Titograd players
RCD Mallorca players
UE Lleida players
FK Obilić players
OFK Beograd players
Red Star Belgrade footballers
Trabzonspor footballers
Ankaraspor footballers
TuS Koblenz players
TSV 1860 Munich players
FK Mogren players
Second League of Serbia and Montenegro players
First League of Serbia and Montenegro players
La Liga players
Segunda División players
Süper Lig players
2. Bundesliga players
Montenegrin First League players
Serbia and Montenegro expatriate footballers
Expatriate footballers in Spain
Serbia and Montenegro expatriate sportspeople in Spain
Montenegrin expatriate footballers
Expatriate footballers in Germany
Montenegrin expatriate sportspeople in Germany
Expatriate footballers in Turkey
Serbia and Montenegro expatriate sportspeople in Turkey